Hot Off the Press is a 1935 American drama film directed by Albert Herman. It was the second of eight adaptations of Peter B. Kyne stories.

Plot
Bill Jeffry is a reporter who leaves The Evening Call in favor of rival Star Bulletin. When one of the Star's intrepid newsboys, Mickey Karnes, is attacked, Bill, who was merely in the wrong place at the wrong time, finds himself falsely accused of the attack. He sets about unmasking the real criminal.

Cast
 Jack La Rue as Bill Jeffrey
 Virginia Pine as Brenda Johnson
 Monte Blue
 Fuzzy Knight
 Fred Kelsey
 Edward Hearn
 James C. Morton
 Mickey Rentschler as Mickey Karnes

References

External links
 

1935 films
1935 drama films
American drama films
American black-and-white films
Films directed by Albert Herman
1930s English-language films
1930s American films